In mathematics, the Bruhat order (also called strong order or strong Bruhat order or Chevalley order or Bruhat–Chevalley order or Chevalley–Bruhat order) is a partial order on the elements of a Coxeter group, that corresponds to the inclusion order on Schubert varieties.

History

Definition

If (W, S) is a Coxeter system with generators S, then the Bruhat order is a partial order on the group W. Recall that a reduced word for an element w of W is a minimal length expression of w as a product of elements of S, and the length ℓ(w) of w is the length of a reduced word.

The (strong) Bruhat order is defined by u ≤ v if some substring of some (or every) reduced word for v is a reduced word for u. (Note that here a substring is not necessarily a consecutive substring.)

The weak left (Bruhat) order is defined by  u ≤L v  if some final substring of some  reduced word for v is a reduced word for u.
The weak right (Bruhat) order is defined by  u ≤R v  if some initial substring of some  reduced word for v is a reduced word for u.

For more on the weak orders, see the article weak order of permutations.

Bruhat graph

The Bruhat graph is a directed graph related to the (strong) Bruhat order. The vertex set is the set of elements of the Coxeter group and the edge set consists of directed edges (u, v) whenever u = tv for some reflection t and ℓ(u) < ℓ(v).  One may view the graph as an edge-labeled directed graph with edge labels coming from the set of reflections.  (One could also define the Bruhat graph using multiplication on the right; as graphs, the resulting objects are isomorphic, but the edge labelings are different.)

and thus this poset is Eulerian, meaning its Möbius function is produced by the rank function on the poset.

See also
Kazhdan–Lusztig polynomial

References

Coxeter groups
Order theory